The Guyana Sport Shooting Federation (GSSF) is a Guyanese organization involved in the promotion of several aspects of sport shooting in Guyana, being a member of the following international organizations:

 World Archery Federation
 Steel Challenge Shooting Association
 Amateur Trapshooting Association

See Also 
Guyana National Rifle Association

External links 
 Official homepage of the Guyana Sport Shooting Federation

References 

Shooting sports organizations